Old Hjelme Church is a parish church of the Church of Norway in Øygarden Municipality in Vestland county, Norway. It is located in the village of Hjelmo on the island of Seløyna. It is one of the three churches in the Hjelme og Blomvåg parish which is part of the Vesthordland prosti (deanery) in the Diocese of Bjørgvin. The white, wooden church was built in a long church design in 1875 using plans drawn up by the architect Jacob Wilhelm Nordan. The church seats about 180 people.

History

The church was built in 1875 to serve the people on the Øygarden archipelago, who previously had to cross the Hjeltefjorden to go to the Manger Church or Hordabø Church. The church was consecrated on 5 August 1875. Later, the parish was divided and this chapel was renamed Hjelme Church and it was the main church for the new Hjelme parish. Since that time, the church was renamed "Old Hjelme Church" and it has only been used for special situations such as weddings and funerals. Around 2004, the church was closed due to significant maintenance needs. In 2017, the church was repaired and it was available for use once again.

See also
List of churches in Bjørgvin

References

Øygarden
Churches in Vestland
Long churches in Norway
Wooden churches in Norway
19th-century Church of Norway church buildings
Churches completed in 1875
1875 establishments in Norway